Laurence Howland MacDaniels (1888–1986) was an American botanist and horticulturalist. In 1926–1927, he carried out research on the Fe'i banana and its relationship to Polynesian migrations, which was published in 1947 by the Bishop Museum of Honolulu.

References

20th-century American botanists
Botanists with author abbreviations
1888 births
1986 deaths